Robert Barker (died 1571), of Ipswich and Bull's Hall, Suffolk, was an English politician and merchant.

He was a Member of Parliament (MP) for Ipswich in 1559.

References

Year of birth missing
1571 deaths
Members of the Parliament of England (pre-1707) for Ipswich
English MPs 1559
16th-century English businesspeople